Michael Mongillo is an American feature film director, screenwriter, and producer. He is best known for the 2007 mockumentary Being Michael Madsen,  the 2017 supernatural mystery Diane, and the 2021 sci-fi thriller The Changed.

Career
Mongillo founded Mean Time Productions in 1997. The production company credits include the Shriekfest award-winning psychological horror The Wind (2001), the sci-fi dramedy Welcome to Earth (2005), the mockumentary Being Michael Madsen (2007), the supernatural mystery Diane (2017), and the sci-fi thriller The Changed (2021). His work has screened worldwide, including the Raindance Film Festival, the Denver Film Festival, San Francisco Independent Film Festival, Screamfest, FrightFest London, and the New Filmmakers Series, receiving positive press from The New York Times, Variety, BoxOffice, Fangoria, LA Weekly, Time Out, Film Threat, Londonist, and others. Mongillo has also directed several shorts, music videos, and commercials.

Mongillo co-founded the annual New Haven Underground Film Festival, which was launched with Todd Dzicek in 2004. In 2009, Mongillo spearheaded its rebranding as the Maverick Movie Awards and, with Dick Boland, engaged in forming a diverse network of entertainment industry professionals to participate in this international “filmmakers honoring filmmakers” cooperative. Its exponential growth precipitated Maverick Awards for the films Sound City, The Imposter, Downloaded, The Maiden Danced to Death, and more celebrated features and shorts. Mongillo departed the MMA in 2013 to devote more time to his pursuits as a filmmaker.

In 1993, Mongillo wrote the comic book The Philistine and co-creator Michael Zittel illustrated the series. The super-spy-turned-superhero saga was originally distributed by One Shot Press, which went out of business after publishing only three of the six issues in the mini-series. The Philistine was revived a decade later by United Comics and the original mini-series plus several subsequent stories were released as a graphic novel anthology in 2003. In 2012, Mongillo created and wrote the graphic novel The Lost Girl with artwork by Rob Ten Pas. This fantasy-horror romance was originally released by Arcana Studio and in 2015 it was republished in Heavy Metal and digital.

Along with Chris Wiedemann (vocals/guitar), Bobby Judkins (drums), and John Thudium (guitar), Mongillo (bass) was a founding member of the Rock band, 50 Feet Tall (a.k.a. Fifty Feet Tall), a mainstay of NYC's original music scene in the '90s. Band highlights include a release on Deep Elm Records with positive reviews from Alternative Press, CMJ, Hits, Magnet, and more.

Awards and honors

References

External links
  
 Home page of Mean Time Productions

Living people
21st-century American writers
Film directors from New York (state)
Year of birth missing (living people)